Arthur W. Mansfield (November 30, 1906 – June 1, 1985) nicknamed Dynamite or Dynie was an American baseball coach and outfielder. He played college baseball for Wisconsin for coach Guy Lowman from 1927 to 1929 before playing professionally from 1930 to 1933. He also played college football and boxing. He then served as the head baseball coach of the Wisconsin Badgers from 1940 to 1970, leading the Badgers to a fourth-place finish in the 1950 College World Series.

Playing career
Mansfield attended West Technical High School in Cleveland, Ohio being enrolling at the University of Wisconsin, where he competed in football, baseball, basketball and boxing.  At Wisconsin, he played first base, was team captain his senior year, and a member of Sigma Pi fraternity.  After graduating in 1929, he became the athletic director of Springfield High School (Wisconsin) before playing minor league baseball.  While with the Springfield Blue Sox of the Central League he played right field until his contract was purchased by the New York Giants at the end of the 1930 season.

Head coaching record

References

External links

Wisconsin Badgers baseball players
Wisconsin Badgers football players
Wisconsin Badgers boxers
Bridgeport Bears (baseball) players
Dayton Ducks players
Springfield Cardinals players
Wisconsin Badgers baseball coaches
1906 births
1985 deaths
Players of American football from Cleveland
Baseball coaches from Ohio
Baseball players from Cleveland